Association for the Promotion of the Status of Women (APSW) is a women's organization in Thailand, founded in 1970.

It was founded under the name Promotion of Status of Women Group. APSW played an important role in the history of women´s movement in Thailand. While it was not the first women's organization in Thailand, it has been referred to as the first feminist women's organization in Thailand.

References

Organizations established in 1970
1970 establishments
Women's rights organizations
Women's organizations based in Thailand
1970 in Thailand
Feminism in Thailand
History of women in Thailand